Morrill Township may refer to the following townships in the United States:

 Morrill Township, Brown County, Kansas
 Morrill Township, Morrison County, Minnesota

See also
 Merrill Township (disambiguation)